Craig Claiborne (September 4, 1920 January 22, 2000) was an American restaurant critic, food journalist and book author.  A long-time food editor and restaurant critic for The New York Times, he was also the author of numerous cookbooks and an autobiography. Over the course of his career, he made many contributions to gastronomy and food writing in the United States.

Early life 
Born in Sunflower, Mississippi, Claiborne was raised on the region's distinctive cuisine in the kitchen of his mother's boarding house in Indianola, Mississippi.

He essayed in premedical studies at the Mississippi State College from 1937 to 1939. Finding it to be unsuitable, he then transferred to the University of Missouri, where he majored in journalism and got his B.A. degree.

Claiborne served in the U.S. Navy during World War II and the Korean War. After deciding that his true passion lay in cooking, he used his G.I. Bill benefits to attend the École hôtelière de Lausanne (Lausanne Hotel School), located in Lausanne, Switzerland.

Career

Returning to the U.S. from Europe, he worked his way up in the food-publishing business in New York City, New York, as a contributor to Gourmet magazine and a food-product publicist, finally becoming the food editor of The New York Times in 1957. Claiborne was the first man to supervise the food page at a major American newspaper and is credited with broadening The New York Times'''s coverage of new restaurants and innovative chefs. A typical food section of a newspaper in the 1950s was largely targeted to a female readership and limited to columns on entertaining and cooking for the upscale homemaker. Claiborne brought his knowledge of cuisine and own passion for food to the pages, transforming it into an important cultural and social bellwether for New York City and the nation at large.

Claiborne's columns, reviews and cookbooks introduced a generation of Americans to a variety of ethnic cuisines particularly Asian and Mexican cuisines at a time when average Americans had conservative tastes in food, and what little gourmet cooking was available in cities like New York was exclusively French (and, Claiborne observed, not terribly high quality). Looking to hold restaurants accountable for what they served and help the public make informed choices about where to spend their dining dollars, he created the four-star system of rating restaurants still used by The New York Times and which has been widely imitated. Claiborne's reviews were exacting and uncompromising, but he also approached his task as a critic with an open mind and eye for cooking that was different, creative and likely to appeal to his readers.

Inspired by food writers including M. F. K. Fisher, Claiborne also enjoyed documenting his own eating experiences and the discovery of new talent and new culinary trends across the country and across the world. Among the many then-unknown chefs he brought to the public's attention was the New Orleans, Louisiana, chef and restaurateur Paul Prudhomme. At the time, few people outside America's Deep South had any awareness of Louisiana's Cajun culture or its unique culinary traditions.

Along with chef, author and television personality Julia Child, Claiborne has been credited with making the often intimidating world of French and other ethnic cuisine accessible to an American audience and American tastes. Claiborne authored or edited over twenty cookbooks on a wide range of foods and culinary styles, including some of the first best-selling cookbooks dedicated to healthy, low-sodium and low-cholesterol diets. He had a long-time professional relationship and collaborated on many books and projects with the French-born New York City chef, author and television personality Pierre Franey. Claiborne was an advocate of a fad diet known as the Gourmet Diet. With Franey, he worked out two hundred low-sodium, low-cholesterol recipes for this diet.

The $4,000 meal
In 1975, he placed a $300 winning bid at a charity auction for a no-price-limit dinner for two at any restaurant of the winner's choice, sponsored by American Express. Selecting Franey as his dining companion, the two settled on Chez Denis, a noted restaurant located in Paris, France, where they racked up a $4,000 tab on a five-hour, thirty-one-course meal of foie gras, truffles, lobster, caviar and rare wines. When Claiborne later wrote about the experience in his New York Times column, the newspaper received a deluge of reader mail expressing outrage at such an extravagance at a time when so many in the world went without. Even the Vatican and Pope Paul VI criticized it, calling it "scandalous."  It was also noted that he and Franey ordered nearly every dish on the menu, but they took only a few bites of each one.  Despite its scale and expense, Claiborne gave the meal a mixed review, noting that several dishes fell short in terms of conception, presentation or quality.

Death and legacy
Claiborne, who suffered from a variety of health problems in his later years, died at age 79 at St. Luke's-Roosevelt Hospital, New York. No cause of death was given.  In his will, he bequeathed his estate to The Culinary Institute of America, located in Hyde Park, New York.

BibliographyThe New York Times Cookbook (1961) Harper & RowThe New York Times Menu Cook Book (1966) Harper & Row The New York Times International Cookbook (1971) Harper & Row Craig Claiborne's Favorites from The New York Times Vol. 1 (1975) Times Books Craig Claiborne's Favorites from the New York Times Vol. 2 (1976) Times Books Craig Claiborne's Favorites from the New York Times Vol. 3 (1977) Times Books Craig Claiborne's Favorites from the New York Times Vol. 4 (1978) Random House Trade Cooking with Herbs and Spices (1977) Bantam Books Veal Cookery (1978) (with Pierre Franey) Harper-Collins Classic French Cooking (1978) Time-Life Foods of the World Craig Claiborne's The New New York Times Cookbook (1980) with Pierre Franey, New York Times Books, A Feast Made for Laughter (1982) autobiography, Doubleday  The Master Cooking Course  (1982) (with Pierre Franey), Putnam Pub. Group Cooking with Craig Claiborne and Pierre Franey (1985) Ballantine Books Craig Claiborne's Memorable Meals Menus, Memories and Recipes from over Twenty Years of Entertaining (1985) E P Dutton Craig Claiborne's The New York Times Food Encyclopedia (1985) Crown Books Craig Claiborne's Gourmet Diet (1985) (with Pierre Franey), Ballantine Books Craig Claiborne's Southern Cooking (1987) New York Times Books Elements of Etiquette: A Guide to Table Manners in an Imperfect World (1992) William Morrow & Co The Chinese Cookbook (1992) (with Virginia Lee) Craig Claiborne's Kitchen Primer (1993) Random House The Best of Craig Claiborne: 1,000 Recipes from His New York Times Food Columns and Four of His Classic Cookbooks (1999) Times Books 

(story on $4000 meal is anthologized in) American Food Writing: An Anthology with Classic Recipes, ed. Molly O'Neill (Library of America, 2007) 

Quotes
"Cooking is at once child's play and adult joy. And cooking done with care is an act of love." 
"I am simply of the opinion that you cannot be taught to write. You have to spend a lifetime in love with words." (A Feast for Laughter, p. 150)

See also

 List of American print journalists
 List of gay, lesbian or bisexual people
 List of people from Mississippi
 List of people from New York City

References

External links
 
 
 Miller, Bryan (January 24, 2000).  "Craig Claiborne, 79, Times Food Editor And Critic, Is Dead".  The New York Times''.  Retrieved April 12, 2012.
  Obituary at the London South Bank University.

1920 births
2000 deaths
20th-century American non-fiction writers
American autobiographers
American cookbook writers
American expatriates in Switzerland
American LGBT military personnel
Gay military personnel
American magazine writers
United States Navy personnel of World War II
United States Navy personnel of the Korean War
American public relations people
American restaurant critics
Diet food advocates
American gay writers
LGBT people from Mississippi
People from East Hampton (town), New York
People from Lausanne
People from Sunflower, Mississippi
Place of death missing
The New York Times columnists
The New York Times editors
Writers from Mississippi
Writers from New York City
Critics employed by The New York Times
20th-century American male writers
James Beard Foundation Award winners
American male non-fiction writers
20th-century American LGBT people